Bradley Davids is a South African rugby union player for the  in the Currie Cup. His regular position is scrum-half.

Davids was named in the  side for the 2022 Currie Cup Premier Division.

References

South African rugby union players
Living people
Rugby union scrum-halves
Sharks (Currie Cup) players
Year of birth missing (living people)
Sharks (rugby union) players